Christian Günther I of Schwarzburg-Sondershausen (11 May 1578 – 25 November 1642) was the ruling Count of Schwarzburg-Sondershausen from 1601 until his death.

Life 
Count Christian Günther I was the son of Count John Günther I of Schwarzburg-Sondershausen (1532–1586) and his wife, Countess Anna (1539–1579), daughter of Count Anton I of Oldenburg-Delmenhorst.

Christian Günther I and his brothers were still minors when their father died in 1586 and they inherited Schwarzburg-Sondershausen.  Their uncles Counts Anthony I (1505–1573) and John VII (1540–1603) of Oldenburg took up the regency.  Later, the brothers ruled jointly.

In 1593, they inherited the County of Honstein, according to an inheritance treaty from 1433.  However, other relatives of the Counts of Honstein also claimed the County, and after a lengthy dispute, the Counts of Schwarzburg-Sondershausen only received a small part of Honstein.

Schwarzburg-Sondershausen suffered badly during the Thirty Years' War, especially the city of Arnstadt and its surroundings.  The brothers did their best to try to mitigate the burdens of war.

The brothers added the north wing to Sondershausen Palace.

Marriage and issue 
On 15 November 1612, Christian Günther I married Anna Sibylle (1584–1623), the daughter of Count Albert VII of Schwarzburg-Rudolstadt.  They had the following children:
 Anna Juliane (1613–1652)
 John Günther III (1615–1616)
 Christian Günther II (1616–1666), nicknamed the Pious, Count of Schwarzburg-Sondershausen-Arnstadt
 Catharina Elisabeth (1617–1701), married Henry II of Reuss-Gera
 Sophie Eleanor (1618–1631)
 Anton Günther I (1620–1666), Count of Schwarzburg-Sondershausen
 Louis Günther II (1621–1681), Count of Schwarzburg-Sondershausen-Ebeleben
 Sophie Elisabeth (1622–1677)
 Clara Sabine (1623–1654)

References
 Friedrich Apfelstedt: Das Haus Kevernburg-Schwarzburg von seinem Ursprunge bis auf unsere Zeit, Arnstadt, 1890
 Dr. Kamill von Behr: Genealogie der in Europa regierenden Fürstenhäuser, Leipzig, 1870

House of Schwarzburg
Counts of Schwarzburg-Sondershausen
1578 births
1642 deaths
16th-century German people
17th-century German people